The Liberia men's national under-18 basketball team is a national basketball team of Liberia, administered by the Liberia Basketball Federation.
It represents the country in international under-18 (under age 18) basketball competitions.

It appeared at the 2012 FIBA Africa Under-18 Championship qualification stage.

See also
Liberia men's national basketball team
Liberia women's national under-18 basketball team

References

External links
Archived records of Liberia team participations
Welcome to Liberia #1 Online Basketball Portal

Basketball teams in Liberia
Men's national under-18 basketball teams
Basketball